In international relations, aid (also known as international aid, overseas aid, foreign aid, economic aid or foreign assistance) is – from the perspective of governments – a voluntary transfer of resources from one country to another.

Aid may serve one or more functions: it may be given as a signal of diplomatic approval, or to strengthen a military ally, to reward a government for behavior desired by the donor, to extend the donor's cultural influence, to provide infrastructure needed by the donor for resource extraction from the recipient country, or to gain other kinds of commercial access. Countries may provide aid for further diplomatic reasons. Humanitarian and altruistic purposes are often reasons for foreign assistance.

Aid may be given by individuals, private organizations, or governments. Standards delimiting exactly the types of transfers considered "aid" vary from country to country. For example, the United States government discontinued the reporting of military aid as part of its foreign aid figures in 1958. The most widely used measure of aid is "Official Development Assistance" (ODA).

History

Definitions and purpose
The Development Assistance Committee of the Organisation for Economic Co-operation and Development defines its aid measure, Official Development Assistance (ODA), as follows: "ODA consists of flows to developing countries and multilateral institutions provided by official agencies, including state and local governments, or by their executive agencies, each transaction of which meets the following test: a) it is administered with the promotion of the economic development and welfare of developing countries as its main objective, and b) it is concessional in character and contains a grant element of at least 25% (calculated at a rate of discount of 10%)." Foreign aid has increased since the 1950s and 1960s (Isse 129). The notion that foreign aid increases economic performance and generates economic growth is based on Chenery and Strout's Dual Gap Model (Isse 129). Chenerya and Strout (1966) claimed that foreign aid promotes development by adding to domestic savings as well as to foreign exchange availability, this helping to close either the savings-investment gap or the export-import gap. (Isse 129).

Carol Lancaster defines foreign aid as "a voluntary transfer of public resources, from a government to another independent government, to an NGO, or to an international organization (such as the World Bank or the UN Development Program) with at least a 25 percent grant element, one goal of which is to better the human condition in the country receiving the aid."

Lancaster also states that for much of the period of her study (World War II to the present) "foreign aid was used for four main purposes: diplomatic [including military/security and political interests abroad], developmental, humanitarian relief and commercial."

Extent of aid
Most official development assistance (ODA) comes from the 30 members of the Development Assistance Committee (DAC), or about $150 billion in 2018. For the same year, the OECD estimated that six to seven billion dollars of ODA-like aid was given by ten other states, including China and India.

Top 10 aid recipient countries (2009-2018)

Top 10 aid donor countries (2020) 

Official development assistance (in absolute terms) contributed by the top 10 DAC countries is as follows. European Union countries together gave $75,838,040,000 and EU Institutions gave a further $19.4 billion. The European Union accumulated a higher portion of GDP as a form of foreign aid than any other economic union.

  – $75.8 billion
  – $34.6 billion
 – $23.8 billion
 – $19.4 billion
  – $15.5 billion
  – $12.2 billion
  – $5.4 billion
  – $5.3 billion
 – $4.9 billion
  – $4.7 billion
  – $4.3 billion

Official development assistance as a percentage of gross national income contributed by the top 10 DAC countries is as follows. Five countries met the longstanding UN target for an ODA/GNI ratio of 0.7% in 2013:

  – 1.07%
  – 1.02%
  – 1.00%
  – 0.85%
  – 0.72%
  – 0.67%
  – 0.55%
  – 0.47%
  – 0.45%
  – 0.45%

European Union countries that are members of the Development Assistance Committee gave 0.42% of GNI (excluding the $15.93 billion given by EU Institutions).

Types

The type of aid given may be classified according to various factors, including its intended purpose, the terms or conditions (if any) under which it is given, its source, and its level of urgency.

Intended purpose
Official aid may be classified by types according to its intended purpose. Military aid is material or logistical assistance given to strengthen the military capabilities of an ally country. Humanitarian aid is material or logistical assistance provided for humanitarian purposes, typically in response to humanitarian crises such as a natural disaster or a man-made disaster.

Terms or conditions of receipt
Aid can also be classified according to the terms agreed upon by the donor and receiving countries. In this classification, aid can be a gift, a grant, a low or no interest loan, or a combination of these. The terms of foreign aid are oftentimes influenced by the motives of the giver: a sign of diplomatic approval, to reward a government for behaviour desired by the donor, to extend the donor's cultural influence, to enhance infrastructure needed by the donor for the extraction of resources from the recipient country, or to gain other kinds of commercial access.

Sources
Aid can also be classified according to its source. While government aid is generally called foreign aid, aid that originates in institutions of a religious nature is often termed faith-based foreign aid (some examples are, Salvation Army, Catholic Relief Services,etc, etc). . Aid from various sources can reach recipients through bilateral or multilateral delivery systems. "Bilateral" refers to government to government transfers. "Multilateral" institutions, such as the World Bank or UNICEF, pool aid from one or more sources and disperse it among many recipients.

International aid in the form of gifts by individuals or businesses (aka, "private giving") are generally administered by charities or philanthropic organizations who batch them and then channel these to the recipient country.

Urgency
Aid may be also classified based on urgency into emergency aid and development aid. Emergency aid is rapid assistance given to a people in immediate distress by individuals, organizations, or governments to relieve suffering, during and after man-made emergencies (like wars) and natural disasters. The term often carries an international connotation, but this is not always the case. It is often distinguished from development aid by being focused on relieving suffering caused by natural disaster or conflict, rather than removing the root causes of poverty or vulnerability. Development aid is aid given to support development in general which can be economic development or social development in developing countries. It is distinguished from humanitarian aid as being aimed at alleviating poverty in the long term, rather than alleviating suffering in the short term.

Emergency aid
 The provision of emergency humanitarian aid consists of the provision of vital services (such as food aid to prevent starvation) by aid agencies, and the provision of funding or in-kind services (like logistics or transport), usually through aid agencies or the government of the affected country. Humanitarian aid is distinguished from humanitarian intervention, which involves armed forces protecting civilians from violent oppression or genocide by state-supported actors.

The United Nations Office for the Coordination of Humanitarian Affairs (OCHA) is mandated to coordinate the international humanitarian response to a natural disaster or complex emergency acting on the basis of the United Nations General Assembly Resolution 46/182. The Geneva Conventions give a mandate to the International Committee of the Red Cross and other impartial humanitarian organizations to provide assistance and protection of civilians during times of war.  The ICRC, has been given a special role by the Geneva Conventions with respect to the visiting and monitoring of prisoners of war.

Development aid

Development aid is given by governments through individual countries' international aid agencies and through multilateral institutions such as the World Bank, and by individuals through development charities. For donor nations, development aid also has strategic value; improved living conditions can positively effects global security and economic growth. Official Development Assistance (ODA) is a commonly used measure of developmental aid.

Intended use
Aid given is generally intended for use by a specific end. From this perspective it may be called: 
 Project aid: Aid given for a specific purpose; e.g. building materials for a new school.
 Programme aid: Aid given for a specific sector; e.g. funding of the education sector of a country.
 Budget support: A form of Programme Aid that is directly channelled into the financial system of the recipient country.
 Sector-wide Approaches (SWAPs): A combination of Project aid and Programme aid/Budget Support; e.g.  support for the education sector in a country will include both funding of education projects (like school buildings) and provide funds to maintain them (like school books).
 Technical assistance: Aid involving highly educated or trained personnel, such as doctors, who are moved into a developing country to assist with a program of development. Can be both programme and project aid.
 Food aid: Food is given to countries in urgent need of food supplies, especially if they have just experienced a natural disaster. Food aid can be provided by importing food from the donor, buying food locally, or providing cash.
 International research, such as research that used for the green revolution or vaccines.

Official development assistance

Official development assistance (ODA) is a term coined by the Development Assistance Committee (DAC) of the Organisation for Economic Co-operation and Development (OECD) to measure aid. ODA refers to aid from national governments for promoting economic development and welfare in low and middle income countries. ODA can be bilateral or multilateral. This aid is given as either grants, where no repayment is required, or as concessional loans, where interest rates are lower than market rates.

Loan repayments to multilateral institutions are pooled and redistributed as new loans. Additionally, debt relief, partial or total cancellation of loan repayments, is often added to total aid numbers even though it is not an actual transfer of funds. It is compiled by the Development Assistance Committee. The United Nations, the World Bank, and many scholars use the DAC's ODA figure as their main aid figure because it is easily available and reasonably consistently calculated over time and between countries. The DAC classifies aid in three categories:
 Official Development Assistance (ODA): Development aid provided to developing countries (on the "Part I" list) and international organizations with the clear aim of economic development.
 Official Aid (OD): Development aid provided to developed countries (on the "Part II" list).
 Other Official Flows (OOF): Aid which does not fall into the other two categories, either because it is not aimed at development, or it consists of more than 75% loan (rather than grant).

Aid is often pledged at one point in time, but disbursements (financial transfers) might not arrive until later.

In 2009, South Korea became the first major recipient of ODA from the OECD to turn into a major donor. The country now provides over $1 billion in aid annually.

Not included as international aid
Most monetary flows between nations are not counted as aid. These include market-based flows such as foreign direct investments and portfolio investments, remittances from migrant workers to their families in their home countries, and military aid. In 2009, aid in the form of remittances by migrant workers in the United States to their international families was twice as large as that country's humanitarian aid. The World Bank reported that, worldwide, foreign workers sent $328 billion from richer to poorer countries in 2008, over twice as much as official aid flows from OECD members. The United States does not count military aid in its foreign aid figures.

Improving aid effectiveness

The High Level Forum is a gathering of aid officials and representatives of donor and recipient countries. Its Paris Declaration on Aid Effectiveness outlines rules to improve the quality of aid.

Conditionalities

A major proportion of aid from donor nations is tied, mandating that a receiving nation spend on products and expertise originating only from the donor country.
 Eritrea discovered that it would be cheaper to build its network of railways with local expertise and resources rather than to spend aid money on foreign consultants and engineers. US law, backed by strong farm interests, requires food aid be spent on buying food from the US rather than locally, and, as a result, half of what is spent is used on transport. As a result, tying aid is estimated to increase the cost of aid by 15–30%. Oxfam America and American Jewish World Service report that reforming US food aid programs could extend food aid to an additional 17.1 million people around the world.

The World Bank and the International Monetary Fund, as primary holders of developing countries' debt, attach structural adjustment conditionalities to loans which generally include the elimination of state subsidies and the privatization of state services. For example, the World Bank presses poor nations to eliminate subsidies for fertilizer even while many farmers cannot afford them at market prices. In the case of Malawi, almost five million of its 13 million people used to need emergency food aid. However, after the government changed policy and subsidies for fertilizer and seed were introduced, farmers produced record-breaking corn harvests in 2006 and 2007 as production leaped to 3.4 million in 2007 from 1.2 million in 2005, making Malawi a major food exporter. In the former Soviet states, the reconfiguration of public financing in their transition to a market economy called for reduced spending on health and education, sharply increasing poverty.

In their April 2002 publication, Oxfam Report reveals that aid tied to trade liberalization by the donor countries such as the European Union with the aim of achieving economic objective is becoming detrimental to developing countries. For example, the EU subsidizes its agricultural sectors in the expense of Latin America who must liberalize trade in order to qualify for aid. Latin America, a region with a comparative advantage on agriculture and a great reliance on its agricultural export sector, loses $4 billion annually due to EU farming subsidy policies. Carlos Santiso advocates a "radical approach in which donors cede control to the recipient country".

Cash aid versus in-kind aid
A report by a High Level Panel on Humanitarian Cash Transfers found that only 6% of aid is delivered in the form of cash or vouchers. But there is a growing realization among aid groups that, for locally available goods, giving cash or cash vouchers instead of imported goods is a cheaper, faster, and more efficient way to deliver aid.

Evidence shows that cash can be more transparent, more accountable, more cost effective, help support local markets and economies, and increase financial inclusion and give people more dignity and choice. Sending cash is cheaper as it does not have the same transaction costs as shipping goods. Sending cash is also faster than shipping the goods. In 2009 for sub-Saharan Africa, food bought locally by the WFP cost 34 percent less and arrived 100 days faster than food sent from the United States, where buying food from the United States is required by law. Cash aid also helps local food producers, usually the poorest in their countries, while imported food may damage their livelihoods and risk continuing hunger in the future. Unconditional cash transfers, for example, appear to be an effective intervention for reducing extreme poverty, while at the same time also improving health and education outcomes.

The World Food Program (WFP), the biggest non-governmental distributor of food, announced that it will begin distributing cash and vouchers instead of food in some areas, which Josette Sheeran, the WFP's executive director, described as a "revolution" in food aid.

Coordination 
While the number of Non-governmental Organization have increased dramatically over the past few decades, fragmentation in aid policy is an issue. Because of such fragmentation, health workers in several African countries, for example, say they are so busy meeting western delegates that they can only do their proper jobs in the evening.

One of the Paris Declaration's priorities is to reduce systems of aid that are "parallel" to local systems. For example, Oxfam reported that, in Mozambique, donors are spending $350 million a year on 3,500 technical consultants, which is enough to hire 400,000 local civil servants, weakening local capacity. Between 2005 and 2007, the number of parallel systems did fall, by about 10% in 33 countries. In order to improve coordination and reduce parallel systems, the Paris Declaration suggests that aid recipient countries lay down a set of national development priorities and that aid donors fit in with those plans.

Aid priorities
Laurie Garret, author of the article "The Challenge of Global Health" points out that the current aid and resources are being targeted at very specific, high-profile diseases, rather than at general public health.  Aid is "stovepiped" towards narrow, short-term goals relating to particular programs or diseases such as increasing the number of people receiving anti-retroviral treatment, and increasing distribution of bed nets. These are band aid solutions to larger problems, as it takes healthcare systems and infrastructure to create significant change.  Donors lack the understanding that effort should be focused on broader measures that affect general well-being of the population, and substantial change will take generations to achieve. Aid often does not provide maximum benefit to the recipient, and reflects the interests of the donor.

Furthermore, consider the breakdown, where aid goes and for what purposes.  In 2002, total gross foreign aid to all developing countries was $76 billion.  Dollars that do not contribute to a country's ability to support basic needs interventions are subtracted.  Subtract $6 billion for debt relief grants. Subtract $11 billion, which is the amount developing countries paid to developed nations in that year in the form of loan repayments.  Next, subtract the aid given to middle income countries, $16 billion.  The remainder, $43 billion, is the amount that developing countries received in 2002.  But only $12 billion went to low-income countries in a form that could be deemed budget support for basic needs. When aid is given to the Least Developed Countries who have good governments and strategic plans for the aid, it is thought that it is more effective.

Logistics
Humanitarian aid is argued to often not reach those who are intended to receive it. For example, a report composed by the World Bank in 2006 stated that an estimated half of the funds donated towards health programs in sub-Saharan Africa did not reach the clinics and hospitals. Money is paid out to fake accounts, prices are increased for transport or warehousing, and drugs are sold to the black market. Another example is in Ghana, where approximately 80% of donations do not go towards their intended purposes. This type of corruption only adds to the criticism of aid, as it is not helping those who need it, and may be adding to the problem. Only about one fifth of U.S. aid goes to countries classified by the OECD as 'least developed.' This "pro-rich" trend is not unique to the United States. According to Collier, "the middle income countries get aid because they are of much more commercial and political interest than the tiny markets and powerlessness of the bottom billion." What this means is that, at the most basic level, aid is not targeting the most extreme poverty.

The logistics in which the delivery of humanitarian occurs can be problematic. For example, an earthquake in 2003 in Bam, Iran left tens of thousands of people in need of disaster zone aid. Although aid was flown in rapidly, regional belief systems, cultural backgrounds and even language seemed to have been omitted as a source of concern. Items such as religiously prohibited pork, and non-generic forms of medicine that lacked multilingual instructions came flooding in as relief. An implementation of aid can easily be problematic, causing more problems than it solves.

Considering transparency, the amount of aid that is recorded accurately has risen from 42% in 2005 to 48% in 2007.

Improving the economic efficiency of aid
Currently, donor institutions make proposals for aid packages to recipient countries.  The recipient countries then make a plan for how to use the aid based on how much money has been given to them.  Alternatively, NGO's receive funding from private sources or the government and then implement plans to address their specific issues. According to Sachs, in the view of some scholars, this system is inherently ineffective.

According to Sachs, we should redefine how we think of aid.  The first step should be to learn what developing countries hope to accomplish and how much money they need to accomplish those goals.  Goals should be made with the Millennium Development Goals in mind for these furnish real metrics for providing basic needs.  The "actual transfer of funds must be based on rigorous, country-specific plans that are developed through open and consultative processes, backed by good governance in the recipient countries, as well as careful planning and evaluation."

Possibilities are also emerging as some developing countries are experiencing rapid economic growth, they are able to provide their own expertise gained from their recent transition. This knowledge transfer can be seen in donors, such as Brazil, whose $1 billion in aid outstrips that of many traditional donors. Brazil provides most of its aid in the form of technical expertise and knowledge transfers. This has been described by some observers as a 'global model in waiting'.

Criticism

Statistical studies have produced widely differing assessments of the correlation between aid and economic growth: there is little consensus with some studies find a positive correlation while others find either no correlation or a negative correlation. One consistent finding is that project aid tends to cluster in richer parts of countries, meaning most aid is not given to poor countries or poor recipients. In the case of Africa, Asante (1985) gives the following assessment:

Summing up the experience of African countries both at the national and at the regional levels it is no exaggeration to suggest that, on balance, foreign assistance, especially foreign capitalism, has been somewhat deleterious to African development. It must be admitted, however, that the pattern of development is complex and the effect upon it of foreign assistance is still not clearly determined. But the limited evidence available suggests that the forms in which foreign resources have been extended to Africa over the past twenty-five years, insofar as they are concerned with economic development, are, to a great extent, counterproductive.

Peter Singer argues that over the last three decades, "aid has added around one percentage point to the annual growth rate of the bottom billion." He argues that this has made the difference between "stagnation and severe cumulative decline." Aid can make progress towards reducing poverty worldwide, or at least help prevent cumulative decline. Despite the intense criticism on aid, there are some promising numbers. In 1990, approximately 43 percent of the world's population was living on less than $1.25 a day and has dropped to about 16 percent in 2008. Maternal deaths have dropped from 543,000 in 1990 to 287,000 in 2010. Under-five mortality rates have also dropped, from 12 million in 1990 to 6.9 million in 2011. Although these numbers alone sound promising, there is a gray overcast: many of these numbers actually are falling short of the Millennium Development Goals. There are only a few goals that have already been met or projected to be met by the 2015 deadline.

The economist William Easterly and others have argued that aid can often distort incentives in poor countries in various harmful ways. Aid can also involve inflows of money to poor countries that have some similarities to inflows of money from natural resources that provoke the resource curse. This is partially because aid given in the form of foreign currency causes exchange rate to become less competitive and this impedes the growth of manufacturing sector which is more conducive in the cheap labour conditions. Aid also can take the pressure off and delay the painful changes required in the economy to shift from agriculture to manufacturing.

Some believe that aid is offset by other economic programs such as agricultural subsidies. Mark Malloch Brown, former head of the United Nations Development Program, estimated that farm subsidies cost poor countries about US$50 billion a year in lost agricultural exports:

It is the extraordinary distortion of global trade, where the West spends $360 billion a year on protecting its agriculture with a network of subsidies and tariffs that costs developing countries about US$50 billion in potential lost agricultural exports. Fifty billion dollars is the equivalent of today's level of development assistance.

Some have argued that the major international aid organizations have formed an aid cartel.

In response to aid critics, a movement to reform U.S. foreign aid has started to gain momentum. In the United States, leaders of this movement include the Center for Global Development, Oxfam America, the Brookings Institution, InterAction, and Bread for the World. The various organizations have united to call for a new Foreign Assistance Act, a national development strategy, and a new cabinet-level department for development.

In November 2012, a spoof charity music video was produced by a South African rapper named Breezy V. The video "Africa for Norway" promoting "Radi-Aid" was a parody of Western charity initiatives like Band Aid which, he felt, exclusively encouraged small donations to starving children, creating a stereotypically negative view of the continent. Aid in his opinion should be about funding initiatives and projects with emotional motivation as well as money. The parody video shows Africans getting together to campaign for Norwegian people suffering from frostbite by supplying them with unwanted radiators.

Anthropologist and researcher Jason Hickel concludes from a 2016 report by the US-based Global Financial Integrity (GFI) and the Centre for Applied Research at the Norwegian School of Economics that

the usual development narrative has it backwards. Aid is effectively flowing in reverse. Rich countries aren’t developing poor countries; poor countries are developing rich ones... The aid narrative begins to seem a bit naïve when we take these reverse flows into account. It becomes clear that aid does little but mask the maldistribution of resources around the world. It makes the takers seem like givers, granting them a kind of moral high ground while preventing those of us who care about global poverty from understanding how the system really works.

Unintended consequences 
Some of the unintended effects include labor and production disincentives, changes in recipients' food consumption patterns and natural resources use patterns, distortion of social safety nets, distortion of NGO operational activities, price changes, and trade displacement. These issues arise from targeting inefficacy and poor timing of aid programs. Food aid can harm producers by driving down prices of local products, whereas the producers are not themselves beneficiaries of food aid. Unintentional harm occurs when food aid arrives or is purchased at the wrong time, when food aid distribution is not well-targeted to food-insecure households, and when the local market is relatively poorly integrated with broader national, regional and global markets. The use of food aid for emergencies can reduce the unintended consequences, although it can contribute to other associated with the use of food as a weapon or prolonging or intensifying the duration of civil conflicts. Also, aid attached to institution building and democratization can often result in the consolidation of autocratic governments when effective monitoring is absent.

Increasing conflict duration 
International aid organizations identify theft by armed forces on the ground as a primary unintended consequence through which food aid and other types of humanitarian aid promote conflict. Food aid usually has to be transported across large geographic territories and during the transportation it becomes a target for armed forces, especially in countries where the ruling government has limited control outside of the capital. Accounts from Somalia in the early 1990s indicate that between 20 and 80 percent of all food aid was stolen, looted, or confiscated. In the former Yugoslavia, the UN Refugee Agency (UNHCR) lost up to 30 percent of the total value of aid to Serbian armed forces. On top of that 30 percent, bribes were given to Croatian forces to pass their roadblocks in order to reach Bosnia.

The value of the stolen or lost provisions can exceed the value of the food aid alone since convoy vehicles and telecommunication equipment are also stolen. MSF Holland, international aid organization operating in Chad and Darfur, underscored the strategic importance of these goods, stating that these "vehicles and communications equipment have a value beyond their monetary worth for armed actors, increasing their capacity to wage war"

A famous instance of humanitarian aid unintentionally helping rebel groups occurred during the Nigeria-Biafra civil war in the late 1960s, where the rebel leader Odumegwu Ojukwu only allowed aid to enter the region of Biafra if it was shipped on his planes. These shipments of humanitarian aid helped the rebel leader to circumvent the siege on Biafra placed by the Nigerian government. These stolen shipments of humanitarian aid caused the Biafran civil war to last years longer than it would have without the aid, claim experts.

The most well-known instances of aid being seized by local warlords in recent years come from Somalia, where food aid is funneled to the Shabab, a Somali militant group that controls much of Southern Somalia. Moreover, reports reveal that Somali contractors for aid agencies have formed a cartel and act as important power brokers, arming opposition groups with the profits made from the stolen aid"

Rwandan government appropriation of food aid in the early 1990s was so problematic that aid shipments were canceled multiple times. In Zimbabwe in 2003, Human Rights Watch documented examples of residents being forced to display ZANU-PF Party membership cards before being given government food aid. In eastern Zaire, leaders of the Hema ethnic group allowed the arrival of international aid organizations only upon agreement not give aid to the Lendu (opposition of Hema). Humanitarian aid workers have acknowledged the threat of stolen aid and have developed strategies for minimizing the amount of theft en route. However, aid can fuel conflict even if successfully delivered to the intended population as the recipient populations often include members of rebel groups or militia groups, or aid is "taxed" by such groups.

Academic research emphatically demonstrates that on average food aid promotes civil conflict. Namely, increase in US food aid leads to an increase in the incidence of armed civil conflict in the recipient country. Another correlation demonstrated is food aid prolonging existing conflicts, specifically among countries with a recent history of civil conflict. However, it is important to note that this does not find an effect on conflict in countries without a recent history of civil conflict. Moreover, different types of international aid other than food which is easily stolen during its delivery, namely technical assistance and cash transfers, can have different effects on civil conflict.

Community-driven development (CDD) programs have become one of the most popular tools for delivering development aid. In 2012, the World Bank supported 400 CDD programs in 94 countries, valued at US$30 billion. Academic research scrutinizes the effect of community-driven development programs on civil conflict. The Philippines’ flagship development program KALAHI-CIDSS is concluded to have led to an increase in violent conflict in the country. After the program's start, some municipalities experienced and statistically significant and large increase in casualties, as compared to other municipalities who were not part of the CDD. Casualties suffered by government forces as a result of insurgent-initiated attacks increased significantly.

These results are consistent with other examples of humanitarian aid exacerbating civil conflict. One explanation is that insurgents attempt to sabotage CDD programs for political reasons – successful implementation of a government-supported project could weaken the insurgents' position. Related findings of Beath, Christia, and Enikolopov further demonstrate that a successful community-driven development program increased support for the government in Afghanistan by exacerbating conflict in the short term, revealing an unintended consequence of the aid.

Dependency and other economic effects 

One of the economic cases against aid transfers, in the form of food or other resources, is that it discourages recipients from working, everything else held constant. This claim undermines the support for transfers, as heated debates over the past decade about domestic welfare programs in Europe and North America show. Targeting errors of inclusion are said to magnify the labor market disincentive effects inherent to food aid (or any other form of transfer) by providing benefits to those who are most able and willing to turn transfers into leisure instead of increased food consumption.

Labor distortion can arise when Food-For-Work (FFW) Programs are more attractive than work on recipients' own farms/businesses, either because the FFW pays immediately, or because the household considers the payoffs to the FFW project to be higher than the returns to labor on its own plots. Food aid programs hence take productive inputs away from local private production, creating a distortion due to substitution effects, rather than income effects.

Beyond labor disincentive effects, food aid can have the unintended consequence of discouraging household-level production. Poor timing of aid and FFW wages that are above market rates cause negative dependency by diverting labor from local private uses, particularly if FFW obligations decrease labor on a household's own enterprises during a critical part of the production cycle.This type of disincentive impacts not only food aid recipients but also producers who sell to areas receiving food aid flows.

FFW programs are often used to counter a perceived dependency syndrome associated with freely distributed food. However, poorly designed FFW programs may cause more risk of harming local production than the benefits of free food distribution. In structurally weak economies, FFW program design is not as simple as determining the appropriate wage rate. Empirical evidence from rural Ethiopia shows that higher-income households had excess labor and thus lower (not higher as expected) value of time, and therefore allocated this labor to FFW schemes in which poorer households could not afford to participate due to labor scarcity. Similarly, FFW programs in Cambodia have shown to be an additional, not alternative, source of employment and that the very poor rarely participate due to labor constraints.

Furthermore, food aid can drive down local or national food prices in at least three ways.

First, monetization of food aid can flood the market, increasing supply. In order to be granted the right to monetize, operational agencies must demonstrate that the recipient country has adequate storage facilities and that the monetized commodity will not result in a substantial disincentive in either domestic agriculture or domestic marketing.
Second, households receiving aid may decrease demand for the commodity received or for locally produced substitutes or, if they produce substitutes or the commodity received, they may sell more of it. This can be most easily understood by dividing a population in a food aid recipient area into subpopulations based on two criteria: whether or not they receive food aid (recipients vs. non-recipients) and whether they are net sellers or net buyers of food. Because the price they receive for their output is lower, however, net sellers are unambiguously worse off if they do not receive food aid or some other form of compensatory transfer.
Finally, recipients may sell food aid to purchase other necessities or complements, driving down prices of the food aid commodity and its substitutes, but also increasing demand for complements. Most recipient economies are not robust and food aid inflows can cause large price decreases, decreasing producer profits, limiting producers' abilities to pay off debts and thereby diminishing both capacity and incentives to invest in improving agricultural productivity. However, food aid distributed directly or through FFW programs to households in northern Kenya during the lean season can foster increased purchase of agricultural inputs such as improved seeds, fertilizer and hired labor, thereby increasing agricultural productivity.

Corruption 
A 2020 article published in Studies in Comparative International Development analyzed contract-level data over the period 1998 through 2008 in more than a hundred recipient countries. As a risk indicator for corruption, the study used the prevalence of single bids submitted in "high-risk" competitive tenders for procurement contracts funded by World Bank development aid. ("High-risk" tenders are those with a higher degree of World Bank oversight and control; as a result, the study authors noted that "our findings are not representative of all aid spending financed by the World Bank, but only that part where risks are higher" and more stringent oversight thus deemed necessary.) The study authors found "that donor efforts to control corruption in aid spending through national procurement systems, by tightening oversight and increasing market openness, were effective in reducing corruption risks." The study also found that countries with high party system institutionalization (PSI) and countries with greater state capacity had lower prevalence of single bidding, lending support for "theories of corruption control based on reducing opportunities and increasing constraints on the power of public administrators."

A 2018 study published in the Journal of Public Economics investigated with Chinese aid projects in Africa increased local-level corruption. Matching Afrobarometer data (on perceptions of corruption) to georeferenced data on Chinese development finance project sites, the study found that active Chinese project sites had more widespread local corruption. The study found that the apparent increase in corruption did not appear to be driven by increased economic activity, but rather could be linked to a negative Chinese impact on norms (e.g., the legitimization of corruption). The study noted that: "Chinese aid stands out from World Bank aid in this respect. In particular, whereas the results indicate that Chinese aid projects fuel local corruption but have no observable impact on short term local economic activity, they suggest that World Bank aid projects stimulate local economic activity without any consistent evidence of it fuelling local corruption."

Changed consumption patterns 
Food aid that is relatively inappropriate to local uses can distort consumption patterns.

Food aid is usually exported from temperate climate zones and is often different than the staple crops grown in recipient countries, which usually have a tropical climate. The logic of food export inherently entails some effort to change consumers' preferences, to introduce recipients to new foods and thereby stimulate demand for foods with which recipients were previously unfamiliar or which otherwise represent only a small portion of their diet.

Massive shipments of wheat and rice into the West African Sahel during the food crises of the mid-1970s and mid-1980s were widely believed to stimulate a shift in consumer demand from indigenous coarse grains – millet and sorghum – to western crops such as wheat. During the 2000 drought in northern Kenya, the price of changaa (a locally distilled alcohol) fell significantly and consumption seems to have increased as a result. This was a result of grain food aid inflows increasing the availability of low-cost inputs to the informal distilling industry.

Natural resource overexploitation 
Recent research suggests that patterns of food aid distribution may inadvertently affect the natural environment, by changing consumption patterns and by inducing locational change in grazing and other activities. A pair of studies in Northern Kenya found that food aid distribution seems to induce greater spatial concentration of livestock around distribution points, causing localized rangeland degradation, and that food aid provided as whole grain requires more cooking, and thus more fuelwood, stimulating local deforestation.

The welfare impacts of any food aid-induced changes in food prices are decidedly mixed, underscoring the reality that it is impossible to generate only positive intended effects from an international aid program.

Ulterior agendas 
Aid is seldom given from motives of pure altruism; for instance it is often given as a means of supporting an ally in international politics. It may also be given with the intention of influencing the political process in the receiving nation. Whether one considers such aid helpful may depend on whether one agrees with the agenda being pursued by the donor nation in a particular case. During the conflict between communism and capitalism in the twentieth century, the champions of those ideologies – the Soviet Union and the United States – each used aid to influence the internal politics of other nations, and to support their weaker allies. Perhaps the most notable example was the Marshall Plan by which the United States, largely successfully, sought to pull European nations toward capitalism and away from communism. Aid to underdeveloped countries has sometimes been criticized as being more in the interest of the donor than the recipient, or even a form of neocolonialism.

S.K.B'. Asante lists some specific motives a donor may have for giving aid: defence support, market expansion, foreign investment, missionary enterprise, cultural extension.  In recent decades, aid by organizations such as the International Monetary Fund and the World Bank has been criticized as being primarily a tool used to open new areas up to global capitalists, and being only secondarily, if at all, concerned with the wellbeing of the people in the recipient countries.

Vaccine diplomacy

Beyond aid
As a result of these numerous criticisms, other proposals for supporting developing economies and poverty stricken societies. Some analysts, such as researchers at the Overseas Development Institute, argue that current support for the developing world suffers from a policy incoherence and that while some policies are designed to support the third world, other domestic policies undermine its impact, examples include:
 encouraging developing economies to develop their agriculture with a focus on exports is not effective on a global market where key players, such as the US and EU, heavily subsidise their products
 providing aid to developing economies' health sectors and the training of personnel is undermined by migration policies in developed countries that encourage the migration of skilled health professionals

One measure of this policy incoherence is the Commitment to Development Index (CDI) published by the Center for Global Development.  The index measures and evaluates 22 of the world's richest countries on policies that affect developing countries, in addition to simply aid.  It shows that development policy is more than just aid; it also takes into account trade, investment, migration, environment, security, and technology.

Thus, some states are beginning to go Beyond Aid and instead seek to ensure there is a policy coherence, for example see Common Agricultural Policy reform or Doha Development Round. This approach might see the nature of aid change from loans, debt cancellation, budget support etc., to supporting developing countries. This requires a strong political will, however, the results could potentially make aid far more effective and efficient.

The "aid industry" 
Private giving includes aid from charities, philanthropic organizations or businesses to recipient countries or programs within recipient countries. Garrett has observed that aid donor organizations have developed their own industry known as the "aid industry". Private donors to countries in need of aid are a large part of this, by making money while finding the next best solution for the country in need of aid. These private outside donors take away from local entrepreneurship leaving countries in need of aid reliant on them.

Transition out of aid
Researchers looked at how Ghana compares with groups of other countries that have been transitioning out of aid. They talk about how the World Bank reclassified Ghana from a low income country to a lower middle income country in 2010. They found Ghana experiencing significant improvements across development indicators since early 2000s with different changes for different indicators which is consistent or better than lower middle income country averages.

Marshall Plan

After World War II the Marshall Plan (and similar programs for Asia, and the Point Four program for Latin America) became the major American aid program, and became a model for its foreign aid policies for decades. The U.S. gave away about $20 billion in Marshall Plan grants and other grants and low-interest long-term loans to Western Europe, 1945 to 1951. Historian Michael J. Hogan argues that American aid was critical in stabilizing the economy and politics of Western Europe. It brought in modern management that dramatically increased productivity, and encouraged cooperation between labor and management, and among the member states.  Local Communist parties were opposed, and they lost prestige and influence and a role in government.  In strategic terms, says Hogan, the Marshall Plan strengthened the West against the possibility of a communist invasion or political takeover. However, the Marshall Plan's role in the rapid recovery has been debated. Most reject the idea that it only miraculously revived Europe, since the evidence shows that a general recovery was already under way thanks to other aid programs from the United States.  Economic historians Bradford De Long and Barry Eichengreen conclude it was, "History's Most Successful Structural Adjustment Program." They state:
It was not large enough to have significantly accelerated recovery by financing investment, aiding the reconstruction of damaged infrastructure, or easing commodity bottlenecks. We argue, however, that the Marshall Plan did play a major role in setting the stage for post-World War II Western Europe's rapid growth. The conditions attached to Marshall Plan aid pushed European political economy in a direction that left its post World War II "mixed economies" with more "market" and less "controls" in the mix.

The Soviet Union concentrated on its own recovery.  It seized and transferred most of Germany's industrial plants and it exacted war reparations from East Germany, Hungary, Romania, and Bulgaria, using Soviet-dominated joint enterprises. It used trading arrangements deliberately designed to favor the Soviet Union.  Moscow controlled the Communist parties that ruled the satellite states, and they followed orders from the Kremlin. Historian Mark Kramer concludes:
The net outflow of resources from eastern Europe to the Soviet Union was approximately $15 billion to $20 billion in the first decade after World War II, an amount roughly equal to the total aid provided by the United States to western Europe under the Marshall Plan.

Academic theories

Since the 1960s, improving the efficiency of foreign aid has been a common topic of academic research. There is debate on whether foreign aid is efficacious, but for the purposes of this article we will ignore that. Given that schema, a common debate is over which factors influence the overall economic efficiency of foreign aid. Indeed, there is debate about whether aid impact should be measured empirically at all, but again, we will limit our scope to increasing the economic efficiency.

At the forefront of the aid debate has been the conflict between professor William Easterly of New York University and his ideological opposite, Jeffrey Sachs, from Columbia University. Easterly advocates the "searcher's" approach, while Sachs advocates a more top down, broad planned approach. We will discuss both of these at length.

"Searchers Approach"
William Easterly offers a nontraditional, and somewhat controversial "searching" approach to dealing with poverty, as opposed to the "planned" approach in his famous critique of the more traditional Owen/Sachs, The White Man's Burden. Traditional poverty reduction, Easterly claims is based on the idea that we know what is best for impoverished countries. He claims that they know what is best. Having a top down "master plan," he claims, is inefficient. His alternative, called the "Searchers" approach, uses a bottom up strategy.  That is, this approach starts by surveying the poor in the countries in question, and then tries to directly aid individuals, rather than governments. Local markets are a key incentive structure. The primary example is of mosquito nets in Malawi. In this example, an NGO sells mosquito nets to rich Malawians, and uses the profits to subsidize cheap sales to the impoverished. Hospital nurses are used as middle-women, profiting a few cents on every net sold to a patient. This incentive structure has seen the usage of nets in Malawi spike over 40% in less than seven years.

One of the central tenets in Easterly's approach is a more bottom up philosophy of aid. This applies not only to the identification of problems, but to the actual distribution of capital to the areas in need. In effect, Easterly would have countries go to the area which needed aid, collect information about the problem, find out what the population wanted, and then work from there. In keeping with this, funds would also be distributed from the bottom up, rather than being given to a specific government.

Easterly also advocates working through currently existing Aid organizations, and letting them compete for funding. Utilizing pre-existing national organizations and local frameworks would not only help give target populations a voice in implementation and goal setting, but is more efficient economically. Easterly argues that the preexisting frameworks already "know" what the problems are, as opposed to outside NGOs who tend to "guess".

Easterly strongly discourages aid to government as a rule. He believes, for several reasons, that aid to small "bottom up" organizations and individual groups is a better philosophy than to large governments.

Easterly states that for far too long, inefficient aid organizations have been funded, and that this is a problem. The current system of evaluation for most aid
organizations is internal. Easterly claims that the process is biased because organizations have a large incentive to represent their progress in a positive light. What he proposes as an alternative is an independent auditing system for aid organizations. Before receiving funding, the organization would state their goals and how they expect to measure and achieve them. If they do not meet their goals, Easterly proposes we shift our funding to organizations who are successful. This would prompt organizations to either become efficient, or obsolete.

Easterly believes that aid goals should be small. In his opinion, one of the main failings of aid lies in the fact that we create large, utopian lists of things we hope to accomplish, without the means to actually see them to fruition. Rather than establish a utopian vision for a particular country, Easterly insists that we shift our focus to the most basic needs and improvements. If we feed, clothe, vaccinate, build infrastructure, and support markets, the macroscopic results will follow.

The "Searching Approach" is intrinsically tied to the market. Easterly claims that the only way for poverty to truly end is for the poor to be given the capability to lift themselves out of poverty, and then for it to happen. Philosophically, this sounds like the traditional "bootstrap" theory, but it is not. What he says is that the poor should be given the fiscal support to create their market, which would give them the ability to become self-reliant in the future.

In the end of his book, Easterly proposes a voucher system for foreign aid. The poor would be distributed a certain number of vouchers, which would act as currency, redeemable to aid organizations for services, medicines, and the like. These vouchers would then be redeemed by the aid organizations for more funding. In this way, the aid organization would be forced to compete, if by proxy.

Proscriptive "Ladder Approach"
Sachs presents a near dichotomy to Easterly. Sachs presents a broad, proscriptive solution to poverty. In his book, The End of Poverty, he explains how throughout history, countries have ascended from poverty by following a relatively simple model. First, you promote agricultural development, then industrialize, embrace technology, and finally become modern. This is the standard "western" model of development that has been followed by countries such as China and Brazil. Sachs main idea is that there should be a broad analytical "checklist" of things a country must attain before it can reach the next step on the ladder to development. Western nations should donate a percentage of their GDP as determined by the UN, and pump money into helping impoverished countries climb the ladder. Sachs insists that if followed, his strategy would eliminate poverty by 2025.

Sachs advocates using a top down methodology, utilizing broad ranging plans developed by external aid organizations like the UN and World Bank. To Sachs, these plans are essential to a coherent and timely eradication of poverty. He surmises that if donor and recipient countries follow the plan, they will be able to climb out of poverty.

Part of Sachs' philosophy includes strengthening the International Monetary Fund, World Bank, and the United Nations. If those institutions are given the power to enact change, and freed from mitigating influences, then they will be much more effective. Sachs does not find fault in the international organizations themselves. Instead, he blames the member nations who compose them. The powerful nations of the world must make a commitment to end poverty, then stick to it.

Sachs believes it is best to empower countries by utilizing their existing governments, rather than trying to circumnavigate them. He remarks that while the corruption argument is logically valid in that corruption harms the efficiency of aid, levels of corruption tend to be much higher on average for countries with low levels of GDP. He contends that this hurdle in government should not disqualify entire populations for much needed aid from the west.

Sachs does not see the need for independent evaluators, and sees them as a detractor to proper progress. He argues that many facets of aid cannot be effectively quantified, and thus it is not fair to try to put empirical benchmarks on the effectiveness of aid.

Sachs' view makes it a point to attack and attempt to disprove many of the ideas that the more "pessimistic" Easterly stands on.

First, he points to economic freedom. One of the common threads of logic in aid is that countries need to develop economically in order to rise from poverty. On this, there is not a ton of debate. However, Sachs contends that Easterly, and many other neo-Liberal economists believe high levels of economic freedom in these emerging markets is almost a necessity to development. Sachs himself does not believe this. He cites the lack of correlation between the average degrees of Economic Freedom in countries and their yearly GDP growth, which in his data set is completely inconclusive.

Also, Sachs contends that democratization is not an integral part of having efficient aid distribution. Rather than attach strings to our aid dollars, or only working with democracies or "good governments", Sachs believes we should consider the type of government in the needy country as a secondary concern.

Sachs' entire approach stands on the assertion that abject poverty could be ended worldwide by 2025.

David Dollar
Dollar/Collier showed that current allocations of aid are allocated inefficiently. They came to the conclusion that aid money is given in many cases as an incentive to change policy, and for political reasons, which in many cases can be less efficient than the optimal condition. They agree that bad policy is detrimental to economic growth, which is a key component of poverty reduction, but have found that aid dollars do not significantly incentivize governments to change policy. In fact, they have negligible impact. As an alternative, Dollar proposes that aid be funneled more towards countries with "good" policy and less than optimal amounts of aid for their massive amounts of poverty. With respect to "optimal amounts" Dollar calculated the marginal productivity of each additional dollar of foreign aid for the countries sampled, and saw that some countries had very high rates of marginal productivity (each dollar went further), while others [with particularly high amounts of aid, and lower levels of poverty] had low [and sometimes negative] levels of marginal productivity. In terms of economic efficiency, aid funding would be best allocated towards countries whose marginal productivities per dollar were highest, and away from those countries who had low to negative marginal productivities.  The conclusion was that while an estimated 10 million people are lifted from poverty with current aid policies, that number could be increased to 19 million with efficient aid allocation.

"New Conditionality"
New Conditionality is the term used in a paper to describe somewhat of a compromise between Dollar and Hansen. Paul Mosely describes how policy is important, and that aid distribution is improper. However, unlike Dollar, "New Conditionality" claims that the most important factors in efficiency of aid are income distributions in the recipient country and corruption.

McGillivray
One of the problems in foreign aid allocation is the marginalization of the fragile state. The fragile state, with its high volatility, and risk of failure scares away donors. The people of those states feel harm and are marginalized as a result. Additionally, the fate of neighboring states is important, as economies of the directly adjacent states to those impoverished, volatile "fragile states" can be negatively impacted by as much as 1.6% of their GDP per year. This is no small figure.  McGillivray advocates for the reduced volatility of aid flows, which can only be attained through analysis and coordination.

Aid on the Edge of Chaos
A persistent problem in foreign aid is what some have called a 'neo-Newtonian' paradigm for thinking and action. Development and humanitarian problems are frequently dealt with as if they are simple, linear, and best addressed through the application of 'best practices' developed in Western countries and then applied ad infinitum by aid agencies. This approach has come under sustained criticism in Ben Ramalingam's Aid on the Edge of Chaos. This work advocates that aid agencies should embrace the ideas and principles of complex adaptive systems research in order to improve how they think about and act on development problems.

Public attitudes
Academic research has suggested that members of the public overestimate how much their governments spend on aid. There is significant opposition to spending on aid but experiments have demonstrated that providing people with more information about correct levels of spending reduces this opposition.

See also
 Aid agency
 Debt relief
 Development aid
 International Aid Transparency Initiative
 Transparency International
 White savior
Effective altruism

Nations:

 Australian Agency for International Development
 China foreign aid
 Department for International Development (United Kingdom)
 International economic cooperation policy of Japan
 Saudi foreign assistance
 Swedish International Development Cooperation Agency
 United States foreign aid

Notes

References

Citations

Sources 

 
 
 
 
  A compilation of case studies of successful foreign assistance by the Center for Global Development.
  – analysis of the proportion of aid wasted on consultants, tied aid, etc.

Further reading

External links 

 Foreign Relations and International Aid resources from University of Colorado–Boulder
 
 AidData – a web portal for information on development aid, including a database of aid activities financed by donors worldwide
 EuropeAid Cooperation Office
 OECD Development Co-operation Directorate (DAC)
 Overseas Development Institute
 Aid Reform Campaign at Oxfam America
 Does Foreign Aid Work? Efforts to Evaluate U.S. Foreign Assistance Congressional Research Service
 Foreign Aid at Brookings Institution
 Center for Global Development's Modernizing U.S. Foreign Assistance Initiative
 Aid Workers Network
 www.realityofaid.org
 Aid Harmonization: What Will It Take to Meet the Millennium Development Goals?
 Aid at GlobalIssues.org
 Euforic makes information on Europe's development cooperation more accessible
 The Development Executive Group Resource for staffing, tracking, winning, and implementing development projects.
 European Network on Debt and Development reports, news and links on development aid.
 How Food Aid Work.
 Aid Guide  at OneWorld.net
 NL-Aid
 Advance Integral Development
 Foreign Aid Projects 1955–2010
 International Aid at Islamic Help

 
International relations